Lawrence Timothy Ryan (born January 16, 1958) is an American chef and the fifth and current president of the Culinary Institute of America (CIA). Ryan, a Certified Master Chef, graduated from the CIA in 1977 and joined the school's faculty in 1982, and later moved to administration before heading the education division. In 2001, he became the first CIA alumnus and faculty member to become president of the college, in 2001. Prior to returning to the CIA as a faculty member, he spent five years as a chef in different aspects of the culinary industry. Ryan has received numerous accolades throughout his career from the American Culinary Federation, James Beard Foundation, and various other organizations.

Early life and education
Tim Ryan was born in Pittsburgh, Pennsylvania on January 16, 1958. At age 13, he began work as a dishwasher at a restaurant there. By the time he went to high school, he had decided he wanted to be a chef and enrolled at the Culinary Institute of America. Following graduation with an Associate of Occupational Studies degree, he worked as assistant chef at a restaurant in Irwin, Pennsylvania and then as executive chef at La Normande in Pittsburgh. Ryan also attained a Bachelor of Science and Master of Business Administration from the University of New Haven. He earned an EdD Doctor of Education from the University of Pennsylvania.

Career 
Ryan also traveled to France to gain experience in several French restaurants. While in France, he was approached by the CIA to join the faculty, and returned to the school as a chef-instructor in 1982. Later that year, he became part of the team that developed the school's American Bounty Restaurant. He worked his way up through the ranks at the college serving a number of roles, including department head for culinary education, director of culinary education, vice president of education, and executive vice president.

President of CIA
In 2001, the school's Ferdinand Metz stepped down to become president emeritus. After searching to fill the vacancy, the college's board of trustees elected Tim Ryan from a group of finalists at its meeting in New York City on October 11, 2001. On November 1, 2001, Ryan began his tenure as the fifth president of the college.

Highlights of Ryan's presidency include expansion of student housing facilities and a new admissions center on the Hyde Park campus, the launch of associate degree programs at the school's California campus, and the 2008 opening of the college's second branch campus, the Culinary Institute of America, San Antonio.

On April 23, 2008, the school faculty voted no confidence in his presidency, by a vote of 85 to 9. The board subsequently unanimously confirmed their confidence in him and extended his contract.

Honors, awards, and affiliations
Tim Ryan became a Certified Master Chef at the age of 27, one of the youngest in the American Culinary Federation's history. He was also the youngest president of the organization, at the age of 36. In 1998, the organization named Ryan "Chef of the Year". He has also been one of five Americans to receive a Presidential medallion from the World Association of Chefs Societies. In 2007, Chef Ryan was named "Entrepreneur of the Year" by the International Association of Culinary Professionals, and the International Foodservice Manufacturers Association (IFMA) honored him with a 2009 Silver Plate Award in the "Specialty Foodservices" category.

In 2010, Ryan was inducted into the James Beard Foundation's Who's Who of Food and Beverage in America, a group that the foundation lists as the most accomplished food and beverage workers in the United States. He was also presented with a Lifetime Achievement Award from Foodservice Educators Network International in 2012, and the University of California, Los Angeles presented him with its 2013 Innovation Award. In 2014, Ryan was named one of the 50 most powerful people in the restaurant industry on the Nation's Restaurant News Power List.

Ryan is on the board of the National Restaurant Association and the National Restaurant Association Educational Foundation. He is a member of the American Culinary Federation, a past member and chairman of the National Culinary Review, and an editorial advisory committee member for Cheers, Seafood Business, and Take Out Business magazines. He also has served as keynote speaker at a number of industry events, including the 2009 International Foodservice Congress in Madrid, Spain and the 2010 Center for the Advancement of Foodservice Education Leadership Conference.

Notes

External links

1958 births
American male chefs
American chefs
American Culinary Federation Certified Master Chefs
Culinary Institute of America Hyde Park alumni
Living people
The Culinary Institute of America
University of New Haven alumni
University of Pennsylvania alumni
Heads of universities and colleges in the United States
People from Pittsburg, California
Chefs from Pennsylvania
Central Catholic High School (Pittsburgh) alumni